The Westchester Philharmonic is a professional symphony orchestra based in Westchester County, New York, United States.  The orchestra performs in the concert hall of the Performing Arts Center at Purchase College.

The orchestra was founded in 1983 by a group of music lovers, led by flutist Paul Lustig Dunkel, who served for 25 years as the orchestra's music director and conductor.  The orchestra originally was known as the New Orchestra of Westchester.  In the early 1990s, the name Westchester Philharmonic was adopted.

The orchestra has developed a reputation for presenting new compositions and upcoming artists.  A piece commissioned by the Philharmonic from composer Melinda Wagner, Concerto for Flute, Strings, and Percussion, was awarded a Pulitzer Prize in 1999.  The orchestra was also among the first to present violinist Midori Goto in concert.

In 2006, Dunkel announced he would retire as music director and conductor after the Philharmonic's 25th anniversary season.  In November, 2007, the orchestra announced the appointment of Itzhak Perlman as artistic director and principal conductor.  Perlman debuted as the orchestra's conductor on October 11, 2008 in an all-Beethoven program; the Emperor Concerto with pianist Leon Fleisher and Symphony No. 7. The orchestra is currently led by two principal conductors renowned violinist Jaime Laredo and award-winning Broadway conductor Ted Sperling.

References
Westchester Philharmonic website
Bloomberg News article on Perlman appointment
"Itzhak Perlman Named Artistic Director of Westchester Philharmonic," The Journal News
New York Times review of Perlman's debut as conductor
"Two Orchestras, Two Approaches to Leadership," The New York Times

Culture of Westchester County, New York
Musical groups established in 1983
Orchestras based in New York (state)